Big Brother 4.1 is the fourth season of the Polish reality television series Big Brother. The show followed a number of contestants, known as housemates, who are isolated from the outside world for an extended period of time in a custom-built house. Each week, one of the housemates is evicted by a public vote, with the last housemate remaining winning a cash prize. The show returned after five years break. It was launched on September 2, 2007 and concluded on December 6, 2007, last 106 days.

Karina Kunkiewicz and Kuba Klawiter host the main show Big Brother – Ring. Sideshows include Big Brother – Prosto z Domu Monday to Friday 18:30, a 30-minute live stream, viewers will be able to watch live how housemates deal with the special tasks set by Big Brother. Big Brother – Extra, a show for adult viewers: new, not broadcast in the live stream show at 18:30 or in recaps shows, reports from the Big Brother House. Big Brother – Omnibus, a summary of the past week on Sundays at 17:00.

Jolanta "Jola" Rutowicz walked out as the winner of Big Brother 4.1, winning a prize of 100,000 PLN.

Housemates

Nominations Table

Note

Opening Titles
Big Brother 4.1's titles were an homage to the Big Brother Australia titles, using the same theme tune and eye.

References

External links 
 Official site

04
2007 Polish television seasons